Bellevue Transit Center (BTC) is a bus station and future light rail station in Bellevue, Washington, a suburb of Seattle. It is the main transit hub for the Eastside of King County, serving 20 routes from King County Metro and Sound Transit Express. The transit center is the western terminus of the RapidRide B Line, which runs east to Redmond.

A Link light rail station will be built to the east of the transit center near the Bellevue City Hall. The station, to be named Bellevue Downtown, will be at the east portal of a tunnel and have two entrances at 110th and 112th avenues.

Location

Bellevue Transit Center is located on one block of Northeast 6th Street between Northeast 108th Street and Northeast 110th Street in Downtown Bellevue.

History

The original transit center in downtown Bellevue was opened in 1985, at a cost of $5 million, consisting of 6 bus bays on Northeast 6th Street. It was preceded by a temporary transit hub near the Puget Power Building established in 1982.

A new, $21 million transit center at the site was built on the site in 2002, adding additional bus bays and modernizing the facility as part of the Sound Transit Express program. The following year, additional amenities were added to the transit center as part of the project's second phase; a customer service kiosk, bicycle facilities, a public restroom, and a police station were added. A direct access ramp to Interstate 405 for buses and carpools was also opened in 2004.

Future

Bellevue Transit Center was selected as the site of a light rail station as part of the East Link Extension, funded by a regional vote in 2008 and scheduled to open in 2024. It is scheduled to begin construction in 2017.

The station, to be named Bellevue Downtown station, will be located to the east of the current transit center, along Northeast 6th Street between 110th and 112th avenues on the north side of the Bellevue City Hall. It will be at the east end of a tunnel under downtown Bellevue and the west end of an elevated bridge across Interstate 405 leading towards Wilburton station. The station will have two entrances, on 110th and 112th, and comprise two side platforms.

The ballot measure that approved East Link in 2008 only included money for an at-grade alignment in Downtown Bellevue, leaving a $100 million to $200 million funding shortfall for a tunneled option that would have to be funded by an external source. The city of Bellevue agreed to fund the remainder, but the placement of the station remained controversial as leaders were split between a tunneled station closer to the city center, a surface alignment, and an elevated station along I-405. The final routing was approved in 2013 by the Bellevue City Council and Sound Transit, choosing an open-air station that would save $19 to $33 million compared to one inside the tunnel.

Services
As of March 2016, Bellevue Transit Center is served by 12 King County Metro routes and 8 Sound Transit routes, with local and county-wide connections across the Puget Sound Area. Additionally, the facility offers bicycle racks, rider services, ORCA Card vending machines, and a kiss-and-ride passenger drop-off area.

Bus routes

References

External links

Transport infrastructure completed in 1985
1985 establishments in Washington (state)
Bus stations in Washington (state)
Future Link light rail stations
Transportation buildings and structures in King County, Washington
Buildings and structures in Bellevue, Washington
Sound Transit Express
King County Metro
Railway stations scheduled to open in 2024
Link light rail stations in King County, Washington